List of WACE courses is an article on the courses available to complete the Western Australian Certificate of Education.

Courses 
Courses available in 2009

Format 
WACE courses. Subject code is "Stage number + unit letter + course code".Examples:
Stage 3 mathematics unit C = 3CMAT
Stage 1 physical education studies unit A = 1APES

A successful result in this course may result in a nationally recognised qualification (see VET)

VET 
Some WACE units may contribute to, or result in a nationally recognised qualification.

 See 'Registered training organisation' for more information.

Units 
The units are organised into stages based on level of difficulty. This means 'P', the preliminary stage, is the easiest, through to 'Stage 3' which is the hardest. Since a school year in Western Australia is usually about 40 weeks, and a WACE unit is 16 weeks long, units are usually grouped together and taught together. This can be done concurrently (Both units taught in a mix) or separately (one unit in semester one, and one unit in semester two).

See also 
Curriculum Council
WACE

References 

WACE
Western Australia